Wilhelmsgymnasium may refer to:
Wilhelmsgymnasium (Königsberg)
Wilhelmsgymnasium (Munich)
Wilhelm-Gymnasium (Hamburg)

See also
 Friedrich Wilhelm Gymnasium, Berlin
 Wilhelm-Diess-Gymnasium, Pocking, Bavaria
 Wilhelm-Ernst-Gymnasium, Weimar